NetScaler is a line of networking products owned by Cloud Software Group. The products consist of NetScaler, an application delivery controller (ADC), NetScaler AppFirewall, an application firewall, NetScaler Unified Gateway, NetScaler Management & Analytics System, and NetScaler SD-WAN, which provides software-defined wide-area networking management. NetScaler was initially developed in 1997 by Michel K Susai and acquired by Citrix Systems in 2005. Citrix consolidated all of its networking products under the NetScaler brand in 2016. On September 30th 2022, when Citrix was taken private as part of the merger with TIBCO Software, NetScaler was formed as a business unit under the Cloud Software Group.

Overview
The NetScaler line of products are the networking business unit for Cloud Software Group It includes NetScaler ADCs, NetScaler Unified Gateway, NetScaler AppFirewall, and NetScaler Application Delivery Manager. The products can work in conjunction with other Cloud Software Group offerings, including its Citrix and Xen line of products.

NetScaler is integrated with OpenStack as part of Cloud Software Group's sponsorship of the OpenStack Foundation.

Products
NetScaler is Cloud Software Group’s core networking product. It is an application delivery controller (ADC), a tool that improves the delivery speed and quality of applications to an end user. The product is aimed at business customers and it performs tasks such as traffic optimization, L4-L7 load balancing, and web app acceleration while maintaining data security.

NetScaler monitors server health and allocates network and application traffic to additional servers for efficient use of resources. It also performs several kinds of caching and compression. It can be made a server proxy, process SSL requests, and offers VPN and micro-app VPN operations. It also includes NetScaler application firewall and SSL encryption capabilities. NetScaler ADC can manage traffic during DDoS attacks, making sure traffic gets to critical applications. Additionally, NetScaler's logs of network activity feed into Citrix's cloud-based analytics service and are used to analyze and identify security risks.

There are five versions of NetScaler: NetScaler MPX, a hardware-based appliance for use in data centers; NetScaler SDX, a hardware-based appliance intended for service providers that provides virtualization delivering multitenancy for virtual and cloud-based data centers; NetScaler VPX, a software-based application that is implemented as a virtual machine and intended for small business use; and NetScaler CPX, a NetScaler ADC packaged in a container and designed for cloud and microservices applications. NetScaler BLX, a bare metal solution that can run on top of any Linux, while offering line-rate performance.

In addition, the NetScaler line of products include Citrix SD-WAN, formerly CloudBridge SD-WAN, which provides software-defined wide-area networking and branch networking. the SD-WAN product was end of sale on December 31st of 2022. NetScaler Unified Gateway offers secure remote access of virtual desktops and a variety applications from a single point of entry and with single sign-on (SSO).

The NetScaler Management and Analytics System is a platform designed for the organization and automation of policy management across devices and applications. The tool is intended for IT professionals to manage the various NetScaler products from a single dashboard. This dashboard is applicable to all 5 versions (SDX/MPX/VPX/CPX/BLX) and works regardless of whether the device is deployed in the cloud or on-premises. The platform also provides real-time analytics.

History
1997 - Entrepreneur Michel K. Susai founded NetScaler December 1st, 1997 in San Jose, California. He created NetScaler as a solution for reducing infrastructure during the growth of the Internet in the late 1990s. 

2000 - NetScaler ships the first product, the WebScaler 3000,  a transmultiplexer.

2001 - The company repositioned NetScaler as a security and optimization tool in 2001. NetScaler releases the NetScaler 6000, a load balancer.

2002 - NetScaler releases the NetScaler 9000, a load balancer with integrated SSL and compression offload. The NetScaler 9000 goes on to a position of market dominance within three years

2004 – NetScaler offers a complete Load Balancer with integrated SSLVPN. Security Weekly tests the NetScaler RS9800HA-T and states “This was the fastest unit in the test. If you need the performance then this is the unit to choose.”

By 2005, NetScaler estimated 75 percent of Internet users used its systems through clients including Google and Amazon. Citrix acquired NetScaler in 2005 for approximately $300 million in cash and stock.

2006 – NetScaler offers the 11000 series systems, the most successful and ubiquitous HW Load Balancer of its time.

2007 – NetScaler offers the MPX-17xxx series systems, the first NetScaler with 10G connectivity. 

2008/2009 – NetScaler transitions from the uniprocessor to the multiprocessor packet engine implementation, known as nCore. nCore allowed NetScaler to take advantage of the new Intel multicore chips to continue to increase performance. NetScaler offers the MPX-10500-FIPS platform for high security markets.

2009 - NetScaler introduced the VPX edition the following year. 

2011 - NetScaler offers the MPX-115xx series of systems, an enormously popular platform. NetScaler also releases the first multi-tenant ADC hardware platform, the SDX which combined the flexibility of virtualization with powerful, purpose built hardware.

2012 – NetScaler introduces the MPX/SDX-22000/24000 series systems, capturing the extreme high end of SSL performance integrated with complex load balancing. NetScaler introduces the MPX/SDX-8000 series systems, a low end platform suitable for a wide variety of customers and use cases.

2013 -  NetScaler announces the ultimate in scalability with active-active clustering with 5.4 Tbps of Layer 7 throughput.

2016 - Citrix transitioned all of its delivery products under the NetScaler brand. Citrix CloudBridge SD-WAN became NetScaler SD-WAN. The company also introduced “NetScaler Management and Analytics System”, a console for users to manage all NetScaler products, including the ADCs and SD-WAN, and a containerized version of NetScaler called NetScaler CPX. Citrix released a free developer version of NetScaler CPX called NetScaler CPX Express in August 2016. 

In 2019, Citrix released a new bare metal solution called NetScaler ADC BLX that can run on top of any Linux, while offering line-rate performance.

Reception
Reviewing NetScaler ADC in 2007, InfoWorld gave it a score of 8.6 out of 10. The reviewer noted that it was easy to set up and administer, and provided performance improvements in load balancing and Web application speed. However, there were variable results with features such as TCP session buffering and TCP session consolidation, as these would depend on other factors. As well, InfoWorld said that NetScaler is best suited for "organizations making corporate applications available over the Web for internal or external customers" and "large, heavily trafficked Web sites" but was more costly than other available solutions for a "small, three-node Web farm that will be lightly loaded".

GCN wrote in 2011 that NetScaler is "much more than a load balancer; it’s really an all-in-one Web application delivery system". The site gave NetScaler an A+ rating for features, B− for ease of use, A+ for performance and a C for value. The same article noted that it was difficult to learn and expensive.

References

External links
 

Citrix Systems
Load balancing (computing)
Cloud applications
Servers (computing)
Networking hardware
Configuration management